This is an alphabetized list of Mormon Cartoonists. It includes any notable comic artist who was baptized into the Church of Jesus Christ of Latter-day Saints (LDS Church), even if they are now inactive or not members.

Mike Allred, comic book artist and writer (Madman)
Jeanette Atwood, cartoonist and animator
Pat Bagley, editorial cartoonist and journalist for The Salt Lake Tribune
Steve Benson, Pulitzer Prize-winning editorial cartoonist for The Arizona Republic
Richard Comely, comic book artist and letterer (Captain Canuck) 
Brian Crane, comic artist (Pickles (comic strip)
Brandon Dayton, writer and artist for Green Monk (winner of the YALSA 2011 Top Ten Graphic Novels for Teens)
Ric Estrada, comic book artist for DC Comics
Kevin Fagan, newspaper comic artist and creator of Drabble
Floyd Gottfredson, Mickey Mouse comic strip
Scott Hales, artist and author (Garden of Enid won the Association for Mormon Letters's 2013 Humor award)
Travis Hanson, Eisner-nominated artist and author (The Bean)
John Held Jr., cartoonist and illustrator (The New Yorker) 
Greg Kearney, syndicated editorial cartoonist in Maine, Kansas, Montana and Wyoming. (Topeka Capital Journal) 
Tyler Kirkham, comic illustrator (New Avengers/Transformers; Green Lantern: New Guardians)
Adam Koford, Disney story artist, webcomic artist (Laugh-Out-Loud Cats), and frequent contributor to The Friend
Brittany Long Olsen, writer and artist of Dendō
James A. Owen, comic book illustrator and author (Starchild)
Jake Parker, comic creator, illustrator, and animator (Missile Mouse)
Todd Robert Petersen, writer and artist 
Annie Poon, webcomic writer and stop-motion animator 
Amy Reeder, (Fool's Gold, Madame Xanadu) 
Ed Roth, cartoonist and illustrator (Rat Fink) 
Patrick Scullin (Super Siblings) 
Howard Tayler, web comic artist (Schlock Mercenary)
Brad Teare, comic book artist (Cypher) 
Ethan Van Sciver (Green Lantern: Rebirth)
Noah Van Sciver, independent American cartoonist (grew up Mormon and addresses Mormon history in his comics) 
Sal Velluto, comic book artist for DC and Marvel, especially Marvel's "The Black Panther" and director of The Friend magazine

References

Mormon cartoonists
Latter Day Saint movement lists
Mormon literature
Cartoonists
Harold B. Lee Library-related 21st century articles